Woodthorpe Hall Garden Centres, trading as British Garden Centres, is a British chain of garden centres based in Alford, Lincolnshire. By 2022, it operated over sixty locations. It is the second largest operator of garden centres in the UK, after Dobbies.

History 
The company was started by Charles Stubbs in 1990. Its first garden centre was Woodthorpe Hall, built on a farm. In 2010, it acquired its fifth garden centre.

In 2018, the firm operated ten garden centres.

In 2019, the company acquired 37 garden centres from Wyevale Garden Centres. In December 2019, the firm completed its acquisition of Hillview, a chain of eight garden centres.

In March 2022, the company changed its logo, with the new design incorporating a red butterfly. The logo formerly had a poppy.

References 

Garden centres
1990 establishments in England
Retail companies established in 1990